Illinois Route 95 is a minor east–west state route in west central Illinois. It runs from Illinois Route 41 just west of New Philadelphia east to Illinois Route 97 just south of Cuba.

Route description 

Illinois 95 makes up part of direct highway between Macomb and Canton without touching either. It is an undivided, two-lane surface state route for its entire length. At its eastern terminus, Illinois 95 and Illinois 97 form a Y-intersection.

History 
SBI Route 95 ran from Niota (at the Mississippi River by Fort Madison, Iowa) to U.S. Route 24 at Illinois Route 78 via Illinois Route 9, Illinois 41, Illinois 95, Illinois 97, and U.S. 24. In March 1937 this was changed to its modern alignment.

The future route for Illinois Route 336 between Macomb and Peoria will likely parallel or replace IL Route 95.

Major intersections

References

External links 

095
Transportation in McDonough County, Illinois
Transportation in Fulton County, Illinois